A distribution network operator (DNO), also known as a distribution system operator (DSO), is the operator of the electric power distribution system which delivers electricity to most end users. Each country may have many local distribution network operators, which are separate from the transmission system operator, responsible for transporting power in bulk around the country.

France 
In France, Enedis, a subsidiary of EDF, distributes approximately 95% of electricity, with the remaining 5% distributed by 160 local electricity and gas distribution companies (entreprises locales de distribution d'électricité et de gaz or ELD).

Great Britain 

In Great Britain, distribution network operators are licensed by the Office of Gas and Electricity Markets.

There are fourteen licensed geographically defined areas, based on the former area electricity board boundaries, where the distribution network operator distributes electricity from the transmission grid to homes and businesses. Under the Utilities Act 2000 they are prevented from supplying electricity; this is done by a separate electricity supply company, chosen by the consumer, who makes use of the distribution network.

Distribution network operators are also responsible for allocating the core Meter Point Administration Number used to identify individual supply points in their respective areas, as well as operating and administering a Meter Point Administration System that manages the details relating to each supply point. These systems then populate ECOES (Electricity Central Online Enquiry Service), the central online database of electricity supply points. Their trade association is the Energy Networks Association.

History 

In 1990, the area boards were replaced by regional electricity companies, which were then privatised. The distribution network operators are the successors to the distribution arms of the regional electricity companies. The distribution network operators have a trade association called the Energy Networks Association.

, six company groups hold the fourteen distribution licences:

IDNOs
In addition to the distribution network operators noted above who are licensed for a specific geographic area there are also independent distribution network operators (IDNO).  IDNOs own and operate electricity distribution networks which will predominantly be network extensions connected to the existing distribution network, e.g. to serve new housing developments.

Building network operators
A further, smaller level of distribution is the building network operator (BNO), usually a company employed by the building owner, in a large building with many meters, such as a block of private flats.

In this case, the DNO may act as BNO and its responsibility may include the sub-mains to the individual flats, or DNO responsibility may end at the first incomer, in which case the independent BNO is responsible for the secure distribution cabling 'laterals' between that point and the individual fuses and meters.

Historically such cabling would have been maintained and sealed by electricity boards that preceded the DNOs, and different DNOs supplying buildings of different sizes and conditions, may choose to adopt the wiring in the building or to insist that an independent BNO is appointed. Unlike a DNO or an IDNO, BNOs may be exempted from any licensing requirement by schedules 2 and 3 of The Electricity (Class Exemptions from the Requirement for a Licence) Order 2001 and this allows those responsible for the building network (such as a housing association) to employ any suitable electrical contractor on an ad-hoc basis.

Canada
In Canada, the distribution network operators are known as local distribution companies (LDC).

LDCs normally buy their power from larger companies, sometimes ones dedicated solely to wholesale supply. They re-sell it to the smaller customer. Larger customers typically buy their power directly from the wholesaler, and do not use the LDC.

See also

Electricity distribution companies by country
Meter Point Administration Number
Northern Ireland Electricity

References

External links 
 Energy Networks Association, the trade association for distribution network operators
 Electricity Central Online Enquiry Service

 
Electric power distribution